The 1878 Chicago White Stockings season was the 7th season of the Chicago White Stockings franchise, the 3rd in the National League and the 1st at Lakefront Park. The White Stockings finished fourth in the National League with a record of 30–30.

Regular season

Season standings

Record vs. opponents

Roster

Player stats

Batting

Starters by position
Note: Pos = Position; G = Games played; AB = At bats; H = Hits; Avg. = Batting average; HR = Home runs; RBI = Runs batted in

Other batters
Note: G = Games played; AB = At bats; H = Hits; Avg. = Batting average; HR = Home runs; RBI = Runs batted in

Pitching

Starting pitchers
Note: G = Games pitched; IP = Innings pitched; W = Wins; L = Losses; ERA = Earned run average; SO = Strikeouts

References
1878 Chicago White Stockings season at Baseball Reference

Chicago Cubs seasons
Chicago White Stockings season
Chicago Cubs